Sahnewal Junction railway station is located in Ludhiana district in the Indian state of Punjab and serves Sahnewal. Sahnewal station falls under Firozpur railway division under Northern Railway zone of Indian Railways.

The railway station

History
The Scinde, Punjab & Delhi Railway completed  the -long Amritsar–Ambala–Saharanpur–Ghaziabad line in 1870 connecting Multan (now in Pakistan) with Delhi.

The Sahnewal–Chandigarh rail link (also referred to as Ludhiana–Chandigarh rail link) was inaugurated in 2013.

Electrification
The Mandi Gobindgarh–Ludhiana sector was electrified in 1996–97.

Amenities 
Sanehwal Junction railway station has 1 booking window and no enquiry office. Station is classified under the lowest NSG6 category and has only basic amenities like drinking water, public toilets, sheltered area with adequate seating. Wheelchair availability is not there for disabled persons. There are three platforms at the station and one foot overbridge (FOB).

References

External links
 Pictures of Sanehwal Junction railway station

Railway stations in Ludhiana district
Firozpur railway division
Railway stations opened in 1870